Diarmait Mac Giolla Chriost is an Irish academic in the area of linguistics.

Life
Born and raised in Ireland, Mac Giolla Chríost became a lecturer in the School of Welsh at Cardiff University in 2004. As of 2016 he is a Reader there and a member of the School's Research Unit on Language, Policy and Planning. He is a native of Ireland and an authority on linguistic minorities and language planning, and, in particular, the situation of the Irish language. He is now a professor at the university.

Selected bibliography

Articles
 "Implementing political agreement in Northern Ireland: Planning issues for Irish language policy" (2001).
"The Language Question" (2009).
"Linguistic Diversity and the City: Some Reflections, and a Research Agenda" (2008).
"Irish gets out of jail" (2008).
 "A language of our own" (2008).
 "The origins of "the Jailtacht" (2010).

Books
 Language, identity and conflict: a comparative study of language in ethnic conflict in Europe and Eurasia, Routledge, London, 2003.
 The Irish language in Ireland: from Goídel to globalisation, Routledge, London, 2005.
 Language and the city. Language and Globalization Palgrave Macmillan, Basingstoke, 2007.
 Jailtacht: the Irish language, symbolic power and political violence in Northern Ireland, 1972-2008, Cardiff, 2012.
 The Welsh Language Commissioner in context: roles, methods and relationships, Cardiff, 2012

References

External links
Professor Diarmait Mac Giolla Chriost
Diarmait Mac Giolla Chríost
Diarmait  Mac Golla Chríost
Welsh Writing, Political Action and Incarceration 
Diarmait Mac Giolla Chriost's "Jailteacht": Book Review

Linguists from Ireland
Irish-language writers
21st-century Irish writers
Living people
Year of birth missing (living people)
Academics of Cardiff University